is a 2013 Japanese biographical film directed by Mitsutoshi Tanaka and based on a novel by Kenichi Yamamoto. This film won the Best Artistic Contribution Award at the 37th Montréal World Film Festival, the Best Director Award at the 2014 Osaka Cinema Festival, the 30th Fumiko Yamaji Cultural Award, and the 37th Japan Academy Film Prize in nine categories, including Best Art Direction, Excellent Film and Excellent Leading Actor.

Cast
Ichikawa Ebizō XI , as Sen no Rikyū
Miki Nakatani , as Souon
Ichikawa Danjūrō XII , as Takeno Jōō
Yūsuke Iseya , as Oda Nobunaga
Nao Ōmori , as Toyotomi Hideyoshi
Clara Lee , as a lady of Goryeo

Reception
The film earned ¥664 billion (US$6.36 million) in the month after being released. The film made its Los Angeles premiere at LA Eigafest 2014.

References

2010s biographical films
2013 films
Japanese biographical films
Films based on Japanese novels
Films scored by Taro Iwashiro
2010s Japanese films